Bevann Fox is a writer, from Canada, of Genocidal Love: A Life after Residential School, the winner in the English Non-fiction category at the 2021 Indigenous Voices Awards, and winner, Creative Saskatchewan Publishing Award 2021.

Early life and education
In 2012, Fox received her Bachelor of Arts in Arts and Culture.
In 2018, Fox received her  Master in Business Administration, Leadership from the University of Regina.

Career
Fox is the co-host of AccessNow TV′s The Four.
Fox works as Manager for Community-Based Prevention at Yellow Thunderbird Lodge (Yorkton Tribal Council Child Family Services).

Recognition 
In 2014, Fox received the YWCA Women of Distinction Award—Arts, Culture and Heritage. Genocidal Love got seven nominations, with two wins.

Personal life
Bevann Fox, born in 1968, was originally a Piapot First Nation member, now a Pasqua First Nation member. Fox lives in Regina, Saskatchewan.

Works

References

External links 
 https://bevannfox.ca/
 

Living people

Year of birth missing (living people)

Writers from Regina, Saskatchewan
21st-century First Nations writers
University of Regina alumni